Salthouse Marshes is a   nature reserve west of Sheringham in Norfolk. It is managed by the Norfolk Wildlife Trust. It is part of the North Norfolk Coast Site of Special Scientific Interest, Geological Conservation Review site, Nature Conservation Review site, Grade I. Ramsar site, Special Areas of Conservation and Special Protection Area. It is also in the Norfolk Coast Area of Outstanding Natural Beauty.

This site has grazing marsh and small pools. Birds include snow buntings, Lapland buntings, little egrets, shore larks and barn owls.

There is access to the public

References

Nature reserves in Norfolk
Norfolk Wildlife Trust